is Rimi Natsukawa's second album, released on .

Background

Two singles were released before the album, "Nada Sōsō (Special Live Version)" and "Michishirube." The special live version was sung with Begin and Ryoko Moriyama, who wrote the song.

Song sources

Unlike her first album and EP, Tida: Tida Kaji nu Umui and Minamikaze, the majority of the songs are original compositions. "Manten no Hoshi" and "Dare ni mo Ienai Kedo" are covers of popular music tunes by Parsha Club and Ryoko Moriyama. "Shimajima Kaisha" was originally by Okinawan band Nenes. "Satōkibi-batake" is a cover of a written by Naohiko Terashima in the 1960s, and "Tuki nu Kaisha" is a traditional Okinawan song.

Track listing

Japan sales rankings

References

Rimi Natsukawa albums
2003 albums
Victor Entertainment albums